The Alhama is a tributary of the Ebro.  Its source is Suellacabras, in Soria, and it flows for  until its reaches the Ebro at Alfaro (La Rioja).

See also 
 List of rivers of Spain

Rivers of Spain
Rivers of La Rioja (Spain)
Rivers of Castile and León